The 2013–14 Cornell Big Red men's basketball team represented Cornell University during the 2013–14 NCAA Division I men's basketball season. The Big Red, led by fourth year head coach Bill Courtney, played their home games at Newman Arena and were members of the Ivy League. They finished the season 2–26, 1–13 in Ivy League play to finish in last place.

Roster

Schedule

|-
!colspan=9 style="background:#B31B1B; color:#FFFFFF;"| Regular season

References

Cornell Big Red men's basketball seasons
Cornell
Cornell
Cornell